Henry Otto Wittpenn (October 23, 1871 – July 25, 1931) was an American politician who served as the Mayor of Jersey City, New Jersey from January 1, 1908 to June 16, 1913. He was a member of the New Jersey State Highway Commission and was the president of both the Hoboken Land and Improvement Company and the First National Bank of Hoboken. He was also a director of the First National Bank of Jersey City.

Early life
Henry Otto Wittpenn was born on October 23, 1871 to Dora and Henry Wittpenn in Jersey City, New Jersey. His father was a fireman, and later owned and operated a grocery store at 320 Communipaw Avenue. He had a brother and two sisters. One of his sisters married Edwin M. Houghtaling and lived in Montclair, New Jersey, and his other sister married George Dinkel. Wittpenn worked for his father, and later for his uncle, at family-owned stores.

Career
Wittpenn became interested in politics when he gave a speech for James J. Murphy at a convention in Jersey City. Murphy lost the election, but Wittpenn's speech was remembered. He formally entered politics in 1904 as one of the Hudson County, New Jersey supervisors.

His run for mayor of Jersey City, New Jersey was in 1907 against the Republican incumbent Mark Fagan. Whitpenn remained in office until 1912 when he lost to Frank Hague. While in office he appointed Cornelia Foster Bradford to the Board of Education. While mayor he saw the completion of the Jersey City Medical Center begun under Mayor Mark Matthew Fagan.

Later career
In 1916, Wittpenn, the comptroller of customs at the New York Customs House, was nominated by the Democratic Party for governor. Frank Hague is believed by many to have connived with Walter E. Edge, the Republican candidate, to help Edge win by a relatively slim 7,430 votes by not encouraging Democrats to vote for Wittpenn.

President Woodrow Wilson named Wittpenn as the civilian overseer, of the Port of New York. Wittpenn ran for Governor again in 1916, but was not elected. Henry registered for the draft as "Henry Whitpenn" but did not serve. In March 1929 Wittpenn was appointed as a State Highway Commissioner by  Governor Lawson.

Personal life
He married Caroline Bayard Stevens (1859–1932), the eldest daughter of Edwin Augustus Stevens on January 6, 1915. She was 11 years older than Wittpenn and the mother of Archibald Stevens Alexander, who had died in 1912. Caroline had previously been married to Archibald Alexander, but her husband had been missing since the divorce. She divorced and waited 20 years to remarry, reportedly to ensure that her first husband was no longer living when she remarried.

Wittpenn died on July 25, 1931 at 9:30, at night, aged 59, from blood poisoning. He had been in a coma for the previous two days. He was buried in Hoboken Cemetery. His widow died in 1932.

Legacy
The Wittpenn Bridge opened in 1930, and crosses the Hackensack River between Jersey City, New Jersey and Kearny, New Jersey. It is part of New Jersey Route 7 and is a four-lane lift span.

References

Further reading
New York Times; April 12, 1929. page 26. Mrs. Wittpen gets Post; Hoover Names Her Commissioner in International Prison Group"
New York Times; July 9, 1931; page 28. "H. Otto Wittpen Improves Rapidly"

1871 births
1931 deaths
Mayors of Jersey City, New Jersey
New Jersey Democrats
Politicians from Hoboken, New Jersey
Infectious disease deaths in New Jersey
Deaths from sepsis